CCIR System K is an analog broadcast television system used in countries that adopted CCIR System D on VHF, and identical to it in most respects. Used only for UHF frequencies, its paired with SECAM or PAL color systems.

Specifications 
Some of the important specs are listed below.

Television channels were arranged as follows:

System K1

French overseas departments and territories used a variation named System K1 for broadcast in VHF. UHF channels were similar to K.

See also 

Broadcast television systems
Television transmitter
Transposer

Notes and references

External links 
 World Analogue Television Standards and Waveforms
 Fernsehnormen aller Staaten und Gebiete der Welt

ITU-R recommendations
Television technology
Video formats
Broadcast engineering
CCIR System